The Bazaar of Tabriz (also Romanized as Bāzār-e Tabriz , also Romanized as Tabriz Bazari)  is a historical market situated in the city center of Tabriz, Iran. It is one of the oldest bazaars in the Middle East and the largest covered bazaar in the world. It is one of Iran's UNESCO World Heritage Sites.

History
Tabriz has been a place of cultural exchange since antiquity. Its historic bazaar complex is one of the most important commercial centres on the Silk Road. A bazaar has existed on the same site since the early periods of Iranian urbanism following Islam. The bazaar was mentioned by the Venetian traveler Marco Polo, who claimed to have passed through it while journeying on the Silk Road. 

Al-Maqdisi in 10th century, Yaqut al-Hamawi in ca. 1213 CE, Zakariya al-Qazwini in ca. 1252 CE, Marco Polo in 1271 CE, Odoric of Pordenone in ca. 1321 CE, Ibn Battuta in ca. 1330 CE, Ambrogio Contarini in 1474 CE, Hamdallah Mustawfi in around 13th to 14th century, John Cartwright in 1606 CE, Jean Chardin at the time of Suleiman I of Persia, Jean-Baptiste Tavernier in ca. 1636 CE, Giovanni Francesco Gemelli Careri in ca. 1642 CE and dozens of other explorers and historians have written about the Bazaar of Tabriz, which shows its importance and significance during the different periods of time.

Located in the center of the city of Tabriz, Iran, the structure is divided into rows, many devoted to particular categories of product. These include Amir Bazaar (for gold and jewelry), Mozzafarieh (hand woven rugs, sorted by knot size and type), Bashmakhchi Bazaar (shoes), Kiz Basdi Bazaar, and Rahli Bazaar (produce). Tabriz and its bazaar were at their most prosperous in the 16th century, when the town became the capital city of the Safavid kingdom. The city lost this status in the 17th century, but its bazaar has remained important as a commercial and economic hub in the region and on the silk road. Although numerous modern shops and malls have been established in recent years, Tabriz Bazaar has kept its vital role as economic hub of the city and northwestern Iran.

Tabriz Bazaar has also been a place of political significance, for instance in the Iranian Constitutional Revolution and in the contemporary Islamic Revolution.

The bazaar was inscribed as a World Heritage Site by UNESCO in July 2010.

Ceremonies
The bazaar is used for some important religious ceremonies. The most famous one is Day of Ashura during which merchants cease trading for about 10 days and religious ceremonies are held inside the bazaar. Like other bazaars in Middle East, there are several mosques constructed behind the bazaar, the most notable of them being Jome' Mosque.

Restoration
In 2000, the Historical Hermitages Organization of Iran begin a restoration project of the Bazaar, with the full participation of the shop owners. The rehabilitation project won the Aga Khan Award for Architecture in 2013.

Photo gallery

See also

References

Further reading
Gregorian, Vartan (2003). The Road to Home: My Life and Times. New York: Simon & Schuster.
Levinson, David; Christensen, Karen (2002). Encyclopedia of Modern Asia. New York: Scribner's.
Swiętochowski, Thaddeus (1995). Russia and Azerbaijan: A Borderland in Transition''. New York: Columbia University Press.
Hosseini, Hamid-Rezā (2 August 2010). "وسیع ترین بازار ایران" [Largest bazaar in Iran]. Jadid Online.

External links

 Tishineh
 "The Grand Bazaar of Tabriz" (audio slideshow with English subtitles). Jadid Online.

Bazaars
Bazaars in Iran
Tabriz
Architecture in Iran
Shopping malls established in the 16th century
Tourist attractions in Tabriz
World Heritage Sites in Iran
National works of Iran